Léon Belières (1880–1952) was a French film actor.

Selected filmography
 Figaro (1929)
 Levy and Company (1930)
 A Hole in the Wall (1930)
 The Road Is Fine (1930)
 Atlantis (1930)
 The Mystery of the Yellow Room (1930)
 The Perfume of the Lady in Black (1931)
 Max and His Mother-in-Law (1931)
 The Levy Department Stores (1932)
 To the Polls, Citizens (1932)
 The Ironmaster (1933)
 The Abbot Constantine (1933)
 Charlemagne (1933)
 The Queen of Biarritz (1934)
 Topaze (1936)
 The Marriages of Mademoiselle Levy (1936)
 Heartbeat (1938)
 Monsieur Brotonneau (1939)
 Three from St Cyr (1939)
 Miquette (1940)
 The Midnight Sun (1943)
 Millionaires for One Day (1949)

References

Bibliography 
 Goble, Alan. The Complete Index to Literary Sources in Film. Walter de Gruyter, 1999.

External links 
 

1880 births
1952 deaths
French male stage actors
French male film actors
French male silent film actors
Male actors from Paris
20th-century French male actors